Hatsingimari is the headquarter of South Salmara-Mankachar District (Assam), India. Previously, it was the headquarter of South Salmara Mankachar Subdivision. On 26 January 2016, Assam's Chief Minister SriTarun Gogoi announced South Salmara-Mankachar as an administrative district along with other 4 districts. On 9 February 2016, the district was inaugurated. It has a population of 3445 people (as per the 2011 census). It also has a Higher literacy rate of 77.73% as compared to the 73.72% of Assam.

Etymology
The name Hatsingimari is derived from two different words Hat and Singimari.  The word Hat means weekly market, and every Sunday a hat is held in the place, and that's why it got the word Hat in its name. The word Singimari means, "fishing of Cat fish(Heteropneustes fossilis)".

Geography
Hatsingimari is located at the westernmost part of the south bank of Assam. To its South it is Mankachar town, to its West it is river Jinjiram a tributary of the Brahmaputra. Moreover, it shares its border with Meghalaya in the East. It is just 3 km away from Indo-Bangladesh border.

Politics
Hatsingimari is the part of Dhubri (Lok Sabha constituency) whose present MP is AIUDF chief Badruddin Ajmal (as per 2019 elections). And, Hatsingimari is included 21, Mankachar constituency of the Assam Legislative Assembly, whose present MLA is Adv.Aminul Islam ( AIUDF ) 2021( Assembly election)  Dr.Motiur Rohman Mondal (as per 2016 elections). In grassroot levels, Hatsingimari is under Fulerchar Gram Panchayat and Sukchar Zila Parishad.

Education
Hatsingimari Junior College, Hatsingimari
Hatsingimari College,Hatsingimari
 S. Ali HS SCHOOL, Sukchar
 Janata HS SCHOOL , Kharuabandha
 Nabadip High School , Sellakandi

Market
The weekly market, or "Hat" is held every Sunday from 7am to 6pm. It is held over an area of 2 km2 and is recognised as one of the largest market in Assam. Each type of products has been assigned a specific place in the Hat, and these places are known as Hatii. For example, in Vegetable Hatii, only vegetables  are sold. There are about 30-40 Hatii in the Hat and each Hatii contains more than 10-15 shops and all are always adjacent to each other. Livestock, Vegetables, Cashew, Iron and Steel Weapons, Timber , Fruits, Poultry, Jute, Rice Grain, Clothes, Toys, Pulses and Lentils, Various Spices, Fishes, Beef, Milk and Milk products, Furnitures, Clay products, Dry Fishes, Iron Items, Mechanical Items and various other products are sold and each category has a different Hatii.

Shopping Mall
There's a newly opened shopping mall in Hatsingimari, called M Baazar opened on 28th Dec 2019.

Notable People
 Adv.Aminul Islam, MLA - 21 Mankachar Constituency, General Secretary & Chief Spokesperson (AIUDF), Politician, Social Worker 
 Dr. Motiur Rohman Mondal, Ex MLA, Politician, Physician
 Zabed Islam, Politician, Ex MLA

References

Dhubri
Cities and towns in South Salmara-Mankachar district
Villages in South Salmara-Mankachar district